(born 1970) is a Japanese animation director and animator born in Osaka, Japan.  Formerly a graphic designer, he nurtured the dream of becoming an animator from childhood. 

After doing various works supervising drawing continuity, he joined the Bones anime RahXephon as assistant director and later directed RahXephon: Pluralitas Concentio, his first film. He then went on to become head director of Eureka Seven, also under studio Bones. He collaborated with Gainax and Studio Khara in producing the new tetralogy of Neon Genesis Evangelion films as a storyboard artist on the first film, Evangelion: 1.0 You Are (Not) Alone. He revived the Eureka Seven franchise with the announcement of a brand new theatrical feature. He is a member of the 15-person steering committee of the Japan Animation Creators Association (JAniCA) labor group.

Noted works
 Kyoro-chan
 Saiyuki - Storyboards, episode director
 The Daichis - Earth's Defense Family (Chikyōbōei kazoku) (2001) - Mecha and creature design, staging, storyboards
 RahXephon (2002) - Assistant director, episode director, staging, storyboards
 RahXephon: Pluralitas Concentio (2003) - Director, composition, scenario, storyboard
 Fullmetal Alchemist (2003) - Storyboards
 Kenran Butohsai: The Mars Daybreak (2004) - direction, storyboards
 Psalms of Planets Eureka seveN (2005) - Chief director, storyboards, unit direction
 Ouran High School Host Club (2006) - Storyboards, episode director
 Ayakashi Ayashi (2006) - Opening director, storyboard
 Evangelion: 1.0 You Are (Not) Alone (2007) - Storyboard
 Guardian of the Sacred Spirit (2007) - Opening director, storyboard
 Darker than Black (2007) - Storyboards
 Psalms of Planets Eureka seveN Pocket Full of Rainbows (2008) - Chief director, composition, scenario

References

External links

1970 births
People from Osaka Prefecture
Living people
Anime directors
Japanese animators
Japanese animated film directors